WestWorld of Scottsdale, popularly shortened to WestWorld, is a premier, internationally recognized, multi-use events facility in Scottsdale, Arizona. Westworld annually hosts the Barrett-Jackson Classic Car Auction as well as conventions, trade shows, concerts, equestrian shows and other events. It is located on 386 acres at the base of the McDowell Mountains. It was built in stages starting in 1987 and consists of the following facilities:
 A  Multi-Purpose Tent which is the largest clear span tent structure in North America and measures up to 89 feet from floor to ceiling.
 Wendell Arena, a 6,756-seat stadium used for horse shows, rodeos, and sometimes high-school football.
 11 outdoor arenas
 12 acre turf field
 Monterra banquet facility
 470+ RV spaces with electric and water

The complex also contains various paved and unpaved parking lots for event parking.

See also

 List of convention centers in the United States
 List of historic properties in Scottsdale, Arizona

References

External links
 Official WestWorld Homepage

Convention centers in Arizona